, adopted son of Nagayoshi, was a samurai of the Sengoku period who was practically the last head of Miyoshi clan, daimyō of Kawachi Province of Japan. His wife was Ashikaga Yoshiaki's sister.

Born to Sogō Kazumasa in 1549, younger brother of Miyoshi Nagayoshi, he was initially known as Sogō Shigemasa. After 1561 when his father died, he was reared by Nagayoshi. When Nagayoshi's eldest son Yoshioki died in 1563, he was adopted as a son and changed his surname to Miyoshi. The following year when Nagayoshi died, Yoshitsugu succeeded him as head of the clan.

References

Samurai
Daimyo
Miyoshi clan
1549 births
1573 deaths